Musa Khozh-Akhmatovich Mogushkov (born 6 February 1988) is a Russian judoka. At the 2012 Summer Olympics he competed in the Men's 66 kg, but was defeated in the second round. He also competed in the men's 73 kg event at the 2020 Summer Olympics in Tokyo, Japan.

References

External links
 
 

Russian male judoka
Living people
Olympic judoka of Russia
Judoka at the 2012 Summer Olympics
Judoka at the 2020 Summer Olympics
1988 births
People from Nazran
Ingush people
Judoka at the 2019 European Games
European Games medalists in judo
European Games gold medalists for Russia
21st-century Russian people